USS Shearwater was a schooner acquired by the United States Navy in 1889. She served the Navy until 1898, when she was loaned to Pennsylvania as a training ship. She remained in service in Philadelphia, Pennsylvania, until struck and sold in 1908.

Service history
The first ship so named by the Navy, Shearwater, a steel schooner-rigged yacht, was built in 1887 by Hawthorne and Company at Leith, Scotland, and purchased by the Navy on 9 May 1889 from H. R. Wolcott. Loaned to the Pennsylvania Naval Militia on 31 December 1898, she served as a training ship at Philadelphia, Pennsylvania. Shearwater was struck from the Navy list on 24 April 1908. She was sold in the Fall of 1908 to Mr. Samuel B. Wilson and delivered to him at the Philadelphia Navy Yard.

References

Schooners of the United States Navy
Ships built in Leith
Patrol vessels of the United States Navy
Training ships of the United States Navy
Individual yachts
1887 ships
Spanish–American War auxiliary ships of the United States